Jaime Nicole Nared (born September 14, 1995) is an American professional basketball player.

College career
Nared played college basketball for the Tennessee Lady Volunteers between 2014 and 2018.

Statistics
Source

Professional career
Nared was selected 13th overall by the Las Vegas Aces in the 2018 WNBA draft. She made her WNBA debut for the Aces that year.

After playing in Israel for Elitzur Ramla during the 2018–19 season, Nared returned to the Aces for the 2019 WNBA season.

For the 2019–20 season, Nared played in Italy for Della Fiore Broni. She then played in France in 2020–21 for Flammes Carolo Basket Ardennes.

Nared split the 2021–22 season in Russia with Enisey Krasnoyarski kraj and in Turkey with Antalya 07 Basketbol. She then moved to New Zealand to play in the Tauihi Basketball Aotearoa for the Tokomanawa Queens, where she was named to the league's All-Star Five for the inaugural 2022 season. She helped the Queens win the 2022 championship.

WNBA career statistics

Regular season

|-
| align="left" | 2018
| align="left" | Las Vegas
| 31 || 0 || 9.1 || .300 || .226 || .857 || 1.5 || 0.5 || 0.4 || 0.1 || 0.5 || 2.5
|-
| align="left" | 2019
| align="left" | Las Vegas
| 1 || 0 || 1.0 || .000 || .000 || .000 || 0.0 || 0.0 || 0.0 || 0.0 || 0.0 || 0.0
|-
| align="left" | Career
| align="left" | 1 year, 1 team
| 32 || 0 || 8.9 || .300 || .226 || .857 || 1.4 || 0.4 || 0.4 || 0.1 || 0.5 || 2.5

References

External links
Tennessee Lady Vols bio
USA Basketball bio

1995 births
Living people
American expatriate basketball people in France
American expatriate basketball people in Israel
American expatriate basketball people in Italy
American expatriate basketball people in New Zealand
American expatriate basketball people in Russia
American expatriate basketball people in Turkey
American women's basketball players
Basketball players from Portland, Oregon
Las Vegas Aces draft picks
Las Vegas Aces players
McDonald's High School All-Americans
Parade High School All-Americans (girls' basketball)
Shooting guards
Small forwards
Tennessee Lady Volunteers basketball players
Tauihi Basketball Aotearoa players